Michael Barrett (born May 28, 1970) is an American cinematographer. He is known for his work on Bobby, Kiss Kiss Bang Bang and Ted.

Career 
In 1992, Barrett met the cinematographer Gabriel Figueroa and talked to him about Figueroa's work for the 1947 film La perla, an encounter Barrett considered a pivotal moment in his career plans.  He earned a bachelor's degree in art from the University of California-Los Angeles and a Master of Fine Arts in film from Columbia University in New York City.

Starting in 2001 Barrett worked for the TV series CSI: Crime Scene Investigation. In 2002 he received an ASC Award for Outstanding Achievement in Cinematography in the category "Movie of the Week or Pilot (Network)" for his work on the CSI pilot "Cross Jurisdictions". In 2006 his work on Bobby was selected for the main competition at the Camerimage Festival. In 2008 Barrett was a member of the jury of the Camerimage Polish Films Competition.

Since 2012, Barrett has worked primarily with digital movie cameras. Barrett is an active member of the American Society of Cinematographers (ASC).

Personal life
In February 2020, actress Anna Faris confirmed she and Barrett had become engaged. In July 2021, Faris revealed on her podcast that she and Barrett had married at a courthouse on San Juan Island in Washington.

Selected filmography 
 1998: Finding North
 1998: Safe Men
 1999: The Suburbans
 2001: The Atlantis Conspiracy (TV movie)
 2001–2004: CSI: Crime Scene Investigation (TV series, 31 episodes)
 2002: The Perfect You
 2002: Lone Star State of Mind
 2002: Turn of Faith
 2004: CSI: Miami (TV series, five episodes)
 2005: Lucky 13
 2005: Kiss Kiss Bang Bang
 2005: Goal!
 2005–2006: Close to Home (TV series, five episodes)
 2006: Bobby
 2008: The Mysteries of Pittsburgh
 2008: You Don't Mess with the Zohan
 2008: Prop 8 - The Musical (short)
 2008: Bedtime Stories
 2010: Takers
 2010: Everything Must Go
 2011: Bucky Larson: Born to Be a Star
 2011: Zookeeper
 2011: A Very Harold & Kumar 3D Christmas
 2012: Ted
 2013: Battle of the Year
 2014: About Last Night
 2014: A Million Ways to Die in the West
 2014: No Good Deed
 2015: Ted 2
 2015: Supergirl (TV Series, 1 episode)
 2015: Blood & Oil (TV Series, 3 episodes) 
 2017: The Clapper
 2017: Temple (director)
 2018: Beast of Burden
 2018: Overboard
 2018: Gotti
 2018: Night Hunter

References

External links 
 
 

1970 births
Living people
American cinematographers
Artists from Riverside, California
Columbia University School of the Arts alumni
Film people from California
University of California, Los Angeles alumni